The following outline provides an overview of and topical guide to the U.S. state of Michigan:

Michigan is located in the Great Lakes Region of the United States of America, comprising two peninsulas.

General reference 

 Names
 Common name: Michigan
 Pronunciation: 
 Official name: State of Michigan
 Abbreviations and name codes
 Postal symbol:  MI
 ISO 3166-2 code:  US-MI
 Internet second-level domain: .mi.us
 Nicknames
 The Great Lakes State (previously used on license plates)
 Pure Michigan (currently used to promote tourism and on highway signs, currently used on license plates)
 Spectacular Peninsulas (previously used on license plates)
 Mitten State
 Winter Water Wonderland (previously and currently used on license plates)
 Wolverine State
 The Birthplace of Automotives
 Adjectival: Michigan
 Demonyms
 Most common:
 Michigander
 Less common:
 Michiganian
 Michiganite
 Michiganer

Geography of Michigan 

Geography of Michigan
 Michigan is: a US state, a federal state of the United States of America
 Population: 10,077,331 (2020), 10th in the U.S.
 Size: 96,716 sq miles (250,493 km2), 11th in the U.S., width: 386 miles (621 km), length: 456 miles (734 km), 41.5% water

Location of Michigan 
Location: 41° 41' N to 48° 18' N latitude, 82° 7' W to 90° 25' W longitude
 Regions in which Michigan is located:
 Northern hemisphere
 Western hemisphere
 Americas
 North America
 Anglo America
 Northern America
 United States of America
 Contiguous United States
 Central United States
 Corn Belt
 East North Central States
 Midwestern United States
 Great Lakes Region
 Located next to:
 Adjacent states
 
 
 
 
 
 Adjacent Canadian province
 
 Time zones:
 Eastern (UTC-5/-4), 79 of 83 counties
 Central (UTC−6/-5), 4 western U.P. counties

Demography of Michigan 
 Census statistical areas
 Demographics

Environment of Michigan 
 Climate
 Climate change in Michigan
 Flora and fauna
 Upper Peninsula
 Lower Peninsula
 Northern Michigan
 Flora
 Fauna
 Birds
 Butterflies and moths
 Frogs and toads
 Mammals
 Reptiles
 Geology
 Protected areas
 National battlefield park: River Raisin
 National forests
 National historical park: Keweenaw
 National lakeshores: Pictured Rocks and Sleeping Bear Dunes
 National memorial: Father Marquette
 National Natural Landmarks
 National marine sanctuary: Thunder Bay
 National park: Isle Royale
 National Wild and Scenic Rivers
 National and international wildlife refuges
 National wilderness areas
 State forests
 State game and wildlife areas
 State parks, forests, recreation areas, and scenic sites
 Regional and local parks
 Grand Rapids
 Huron–Clinton Metroparks
 Midland County
 Superfund sites
 Water

Natural geographic features of Michigan 
 Great Lakes
 Islands
 Lakes – Michigan state has 64,980 inland lakes and ponds.
 Mountains
 Rivers
 Waterfalls

Places in Michigan 
 Historic places
 National Historic Landmarks
 National Historic Bridges
 State Capitol Building
 Populated places
 Tourist attractions
 Tourist attractions in Metro Detroit

Regions of Michigan 

 United States
 Great Lakes region, Midwest U.S. Census Bureau region, sometimes "Middle West", "Old Northwest", or "North Central" region
 
 Upper Peninsula
 Copper Country
 Keweenaw Peninsula
 Lower Peninsula
 Northern Michigan
 Mid-Michigan
 Central Michigan
 Flint/Tri-Cities
 The Thumb
 Southern Michigan
 West Michigan
 Southern Michigan
 Michiana
 Southeast Michigan
 Metro Detroit
 ZIP code range: 48001-49971 (1752 zip codes)
 Area codes: 231, 248, 269, 313, 517, 586, 616, 734, 810, 906, and 989

Government and politics of Michigan 

Government of Michigan
 Politics
 Elections
 Electoral reform
 Political party strength
 Democratic Party
 Republican Party
 Green Party
 Libertarian Party
 Socialist Party

 U.S. Senate and House delegations
 U.S. congressional districts
 U.S. federal courts
 U.S. Supreme Court
 U.S. Court of Appeals for the Sixth Circuit
 U.S. District courts

Branches of the government of Michigan 

Government of Michigan
 Executive branch
 Governor
 Departments
 Lieutenant Governor
 Secretary of State
 Attorney General
 Legislative branch (bicameral)
 Michigan Senate (upper house)
 Michigan House of Representatives (lower house)
 Judicial branch
 Supreme Court
 Court of Appeals

Military in Michigan 
 Michigan Department of Military and Veterans Affairs
 Michigan National Guard
 Michigan Army National Guard
 Michigan Air National Guard
 Volunteer Defense Force (MI VDF)

Local government in Michigan 

Administrative Divisions of Michigan

 83 Counties
 Cities, villages, townships, and unincorporated communities
 Villages
 Townships
 Unincorporated communities
 State capital: Lansing
 Largest city: Detroit
 City nicknames
 Sister cities
 Lost cities, towns, and counties
 Ghost towns
 Former cities
 Former villages
 Defunct townships

Laws in Michigan 
 Federal law
 Michigan law
 Michigan Compiled Laws
 Capital punishment
 Constitution of Michigan
 Crime in Michigan
 Gun laws
 Same-sex marriage

Law enforcement in Michigan 
 State and local law enforcement agencies
 Conservation Officers
 County prosecuting attorney
 County sheriffs
 Department of Corrections
 Prisons
 Local police departments
 State Police
 Federal law enforcement agencies
 Federal Bureau of Investigation
 U.S. Attorney
 U.S. Customs and Border Protection
 U.S. Marshals Service
 U.S. Secret Service

History of Michigan 

 History of Michigan
 Category:History of Michigan
 commons:Category:History of Michigan

Historic locations in Michigan 
 National Historic Landmarks
 National Register of Historic Places

Historical libraries, societies and museums in Michigan 
 Historical libraries and museums
 Arab American National Museum, Dearborn
 Byron Area Historic Museum
 Charles H. Wright Museum of African American History, Detroit
 Detroit Historical Museum
 Great Lakes Shipwreck Museum, Whitefish Point
 Henry Ford Museum and Greenfield Village, Dearborn (a.k.a. The Henry Ford)
 Holocaust Memorial Center, Farmington Hills
 Michigan Historical Center, Lansing
 Motown Historical Museum, Detroit (a.k.a. Hitsville U.S.A.)
 Ukrainian American Archives and Museum of Detroit, Hamtramck
 William L. Clements Library, Ann Arbor
 Historical societies
 Bluewater Michigan Chapter of the National Railroad Historical Society
 Canton Historical Society and Museum
 Detroit Historical Society
 Great Lakes Shipwreck Historical Society, Whitefish Point
 Keweenaw County Historical Society
 Leelanau Historical Society and Museum
 Mason County Historical Society
 Michigan Pioneer and Historical Collection, Lansing (Historical Society of Michigan)
 Michigan Supreme Court Historical Society, Lansing
 Tecumseh Historical Society
 Ypsilanti Historical Society

History of Michigan, by period 
 Timeline of Michigan history
 Indigenous peoples
 Algonquian peoples
 French colony of Canada, 1668–1763
 Fort Pontchartrain du Détroit, 1701–1779
 Fort Michilimackinac, 1715–1783
 French colony of la Louisiane, 1699–1764
 French and Indian War, 1754–1763
 Treaty of Fontainebleau of 1762
 Treaty of Paris of 1763
 British (though predominantly Francophone) Province of Quebec, 1763–1791
 American Revolutionary War, April 19, 1775 – September 3, 1783
 United States Declaration of Independence, July 4, 1776
 Treaty of Paris, September 3, 1783
 Unorganized territory of the United States, 1783–1787
 Territory Northwest of the River Ohio, 1787–1803
 Territory of Indiana, 1800–1816
 Territory of Michigan, 1805–1837
 War of 1812, June 18, 1812 – March 23, 1815
 Siege of Detroit, 1812
 Treaty of Ghent, December 24, 1814
 State of Michigan becomes 26th State admitted to the United States of America on January 26, 1837
 Mexican–American War, April 25, 1846 – February 2, 1848
 American Civil War, April 12, 1861 – May 13, 1865
 Civil War units
 Detroit race riot of 1863
 Prohibition in Detroit, 1919–1933
 Rum-running in Windsor
 The Purple Gang
 The reign of Singing Sam, 1921–1930
 New Deal, 1933–1936
 Detroit race riot of 1943
 Detroit riot of 1967
 Kilpatrick and Beatty text-messaging scandal, 2008

History of Michigan, by region 
 Midwestern United States
 Michigan
 Upper Peninsula
 Superior (proposed U.S. state)
 Keweenaw Peninsula
 Lower Peninsula
 Sleeping Bear Dunes National Lakeshore
 Port Oneida Rural Historic District
 The Thumb
 Ann Arbor
 Detroit
 Saginaw
 Wyandotte
 Williamston

History of Michigan, by subject 
 Algonquian peoples
 Bath School disaster
 Chrysler Corporation
 Civil War units
 Ford Motor Company
 General Motors Corporation
 Ghost towns in Michigan
 Legal history
 Michigan State University
 New Deal
 Purple Gang
 Railroads
 University of Michigan
 Toledo War (a.k.a. Michigan-Ohio War)
 Wisconsin v. Michigan border dispute court cases

History of Michigan, lists of people 
 Early settlers
 Notable people from:
 Upper Peninsula
 Northern Michigan
 Western Michigan
 Central Michigan
 The Thumb
 Metro Detroit
 Governors of Michigan
 Territorial governors
 In the American Revolution
 In the American Civil War
 Olympic medalists
 Politicians
 U.S. congressional delegations from Michigan
 U.S. Representatives
 U.S. Senators

History of Michigan, people 
 People from Michigan
 Cass, Lewis
 Chrysler, Walter
 Custer, George Armstrong (raised in Monroe)
 Edison, Thomas (raised in Port Huron)
 Ford, Gerald (38th President of the United States)
 Ford, Henry
 Hoffa, James R. "Jimmy"
 Malcolm X (raised in Lansing)
 Marquette, Jacques (a.k.a. Père Marquette)
 Parks, Rosa (lived in Detroit)
 Pontiac (Obwandiyag)
 Salk, Jonas (University of Michigan faculty member)
 Schoolcraft, Henry
 Seaborg, Glenn T. (1951 Nobel Prize in Chemistry)
 Stewart, Potter (Associate Justice of the U.S. Supreme Court)
 Ting, Samuel C. C. (1976 Nobel Prize in Physics)
 Reuther, Walter
 Weller, Thomas Huckle (1954 Nobel Prize in Medicine)
 Woodcock, Leonard

History publications about Michigan 
 Michigan History magazine

Culture of Michigan 

 Cuisine
 Festivals
 Museums
 Religion
 The Church of Jesus Christ of Latter-day Saints
 Episcopal Diocese
 Scouting
 State Symbols
 Flag
 Great Seal
 Motto: Si quaeris peninsulam amoenam circumspice (If you seek a pleasant peninsula, look about you)

The Arts in Michigan 
 Art museums and galleries
 Artists
 Authors
 Films
 Museums
 Music
 Musicians
 Theater

Culture by region 
 Culture of Detroit

Sports in Michigan 

Sports in Michigan
 College
 High school
 Professional
 Detroit Lions, football
 Detroit Pistons, basketball
 Detroit Red Wings, hockey
 Detroit Tigers, baseball
 List by sport
 List by city

Economy and infrastructure of Michigan

 Buildings and structures
 Airports
 Bridges
 Ambassador Bridge
 Blue Water Bridge
 Mackinac Bridge
 Sault Ste. Marie International Bridge
 Power stations
 Hospitals
 Companies
 Newspapers
 Non-profit organizations
 Radio stations
 Television stations
 Transportation
 State Trunkline Highway System
 Interstate Highways
 U.S. Highways
 State highways
 Railroads
 Soo Locks

Education in Michigan 

Education in Michigan
 School districts
 High schools
 Private schools
 Colleges and universities

See also

 Topic overview:
 Michigan

 Index of Michigan-related articles

References

External links 

 www.michigan.gov, Official State of Michigan Web site
 www.michigan.org, Pure Michigan, Michigan's Official Travel and Tourism Site
 Michigan eLibrary (MeL)

Michigan
Michigan